The Ivchenko AI-8 is an aircraft auxiliary power unit developed and produced by Ivchenko-Progress and Motor Sich.

Variants 
AI-8 The base model which is used to generate electricity or supply compressed air to air-start systems. It can also be used as cabin heating if necessary.

Specifications (AI-8)

References

Ivchenko-Progress aircraft engines